is a 2018 Japanese animated musical film based on Tokimeki Restaurant mobile game developed by Konami. The film is directed and written by Chiaki Kon, produced by Production I.G and distributed by Asmik Ace. The film was released in Japan on February 10, 2018.

The film celebrated the 5th anniversary of the game.

Premise
"Popular idol groups '3 Majesty' and 'X.I.P.' were wondering how to give a special gratitude to the fans who support them as they celebrate their 5th anniversary of their debut.

One day, the president of his agency, Prince Republic, called the leaders of both groups, Kirishima and Date, and handed them a notice of the decision to hold the 5th anniversary event of their debut and a new song for that purpose. However, the song is the same for both groups ... Actually, the new song that was handed over was the legendary song "White and Black" that the president himself tried when he was still active as an idol, but could not sing.

While "White and Black" is a masterpiece, the previous groups that challenged this song was disbanded one after another before the song was performed, ended up being 'cursed'. The 3 Majesty and X.I.P., who argue that they are suitable for performing the legendary song, will hold a special VS live with the right to perform the legendary song at the end of the 5th anniversary live!

3 Majesty and X.I.P., when the power of 6 people becomes one, a miracle happens ... !!"

Voice cast

3 Majesty
Daisuke Kishio as Shinnouske Otowa
Daisuke Namikawa as Tsukasa Kirishima
 Tetsuya Kakihara as Kaitō Tsuji

X.I.P.
Kohsuke Toriumi as Kyōya Date
Satoshi Hino as Kento Fuwa
Takuya Eguchi as Tōru Kanzaki

Production
In August 2017, it was announced that an anime film based on Konamis Tokimeki Restaurant mobile game was in development, with Chiaki Kon directing the film at studio Production I.G and Tooru Ookubo is designing the characters for the animation with original character design by Makoto Senzaki. The voice actors from the mobile game reprised their respective roles for the film.

Release
The film was released in Japanese theaters on February 10, 2018.

Reception
The film ranked at number five in the mini-theater ranking in its opening weekend, later rose to number four the following week.

Notes

References

External links
  
 

2018 films
2018 anime films
2010s Japanese films
Anime films based on video games
2010s Japanese-language films
Films directed by Chiaki Kon
Films about boy bands
Production I.G

ja:ときめきレストラン☆☆☆#劇場アニメ